The Poteau and Cavanal Mountain Railroad was a railway which never operated.  The company did at one time own 3.4 miles of track between Poteau, Oklahoma and what was then Witteville, Oklahoma.  It acquired the line in 1923, but never employed it, abandoning the same by 1931.

History
The line was built in the 1892-1893 timeframe by the Indianola Coal and Railway.
That railroad operated between a junction with the St. Louis-San Francisco Railway at Poteau to a coal mine at or near Witteville, Oklahoma, about 3.4 or 3.5 miles.  Its traffic was hauling coal out of mines.  The railway was acquired by the Fort Smith, Poteau & Western Railroad Company, which started operations over the line on December 24, 1915 and continued into 1918, at which time the coal traffic ceased because mining was suspended.  The railroad managed to function for a while utilizing three-quarters of a mile of its track carrying bricks out of a brickyard, but all operations had ceased by January 1, 1919.

The line was acquired on August 31, 1922 by one D.J. Evans, who had coal mining interests in the area.  Separately, on February 24, 1923, the Poteau and Cavanal Mountain Railroad Company was incorporated in Oklahoma.  The organizers expected that high-grade semi-anthracite coal mining would be commencing from a new location at Cavanal Mountain, and so acquired the rail line from Mr. Evans in a stock swap.  The Interstate Commerce Commission (ICC) approved the sale September 11, 1923.  

However, the mining venture never materialized, so the railway was never put back in operation.  After filing reports with the ICC for a number of years to the effect that the track still existed but was not being operated, the railway reported in 1931 that the road had been dismantled.

The location of Witteville, halfway up Cavanal Mountain, is now within the city limits of Poteau.  Cavanal Mountain, more commonly known as Cavanal Hill with its claim as being the “world’s highest hill,” has long since ceased to be the subject of mining.

References

Oklahoma railroads
Defunct Oklahoma railroads